Ana María Porras (born 21 September 1991) is a Costa Rican track and field athlete who competes in the heptathlon and hurdling events. She is the Costa Rican record holder in the long jump (5.95 m) and the heptathlon (4954 points).

She has been highly successful at regional level, winning seven gold medals at the Central American Championships in Athletics across various events from  2007 to 2015. She won medals in three events at the 2013 Central American Games, including two golds. She is the heptathlon meet record holder at both the Central American Games and Championships. In her younger years she also won numerous medals at the Central American Junior and Youth Championships in Athletics, taking five titles in both 2008 and 2009.

Beyond regional level, she has represented her country at the Pan American Combined Events Cup, the NACAC Championships in Athletics and the Universiade.

She was ruled out of the 2014 season due to having to undergo surgery on her ankle ligaments.

Personal bests
200 metres – 25.96 (2012)
800 metres – 2:24.39 min (2018)
100 metres hurdles – 14.25 (2013)
High jump – 1.70 m (2017)
Long jump – 5.95 m (2013)
Shot put – 11.38 m (2014)
Javelin throw – 32.03 m (2018)
Heptathlon – 4954 pts (2018)

All information from IAAF

International competitions

References

External links

Living people
1991 births
Heptathletes
Costa Rican female hurdlers
Competitors at the 2018 Central American and Caribbean Games
Central American Games gold medalists for Costa Rica
Central American Games medalists in athletics
Central American Games silver medalists for Costa Rica
Competitors at the 2013 Summer Universiade